Mitchel Blake Stetter (born January 16, 1981) is an American former professional baseball pitcher and current coach. He played in Major League Baseball (MLB) for the Milwaukee Brewers.

College
Stetter attended Indiana State University, where he was a pitcher. In 2001 and 2002, he played collegiate summer baseball with the Cotuit Kettleers of the Cape Cod Baseball League. He was then drafted in the 16th round (459th overall) by the Milwaukee Brewers in the 2003 Major League Baseball Draft. Stetter led the Sycamores in strikeouts and innings pitched in three seasons and once in wins. He finished his college career fifth in strikeouts and innings pitched and holds the record for the most hit batters in a season for Sycamore baseball with 32.

Major league career

Milwaukee Brewers
Stetter made his major league debut on September 1, against the Pittsburgh Pirates.

On September 29, 2007, Stetter picked up his first major league win against the San Diego Padres and his former minor league and college teammate Joe Thatcher.

Stetter was up and down between the Brewers and Triple A Nashville during the 2008 season. He was added to the Brewers postseason roster, where he was a left-handed specialist, striking out of Ryan Howard and Chase Utley.

On April 17, 2009, Stetter gave up Gary Sheffield's 500th career home run.

On June 17, 2009, Stetter set a record by retiring his 10th and 11th consecutive batters by strikeout. This was a memorable day for Stetter as he also recorded his one and only save in major league
baseball. In the bottom of the 11th, Stetter struck out the last to Indians batters to preserve a wild 9-8 Brewers victory. As of June 25, 2009, the last 15 batters Stetter has retired have been by strikeout followed by a fly out to Corey Hart ending the streak.

On November 15, 2011, Stetter refused a minor league assignment and elected to become a free agent.

Texas Rangers
He signed a minor league contract with the Texas Rangers on January 23, 2012. He also received an invitation to spring training. However, he was released on March 26.

Second Stint with Brewers
Stetter re-signed with the Milwaukee Brewers on a minor league deal on April 11, 2012.

In 5 seasons with the Brewers, Stetter went 8-2 with a 4.08 ERA in 132 games with 89 strikeouts in 86 innings.

Los Angeles Angels
On November 8, 2012, Stetter signed a minor league deal with the Los Angeles Angels of Anaheim with an invitation to spring training; Stetter has spent the 2013 season with the Salt Lake City Bees, the Angels' Triple-AAA affiliate.

Coaching career
Stetter retired in February 2014 and accepted position as a coach in the Kansas City Royals organization.

Stetter was selected to be pitching coach for the Surprise Saguaros during the 2017 Arizona Fall League season.

Stetter was named as the Pitching Coach for the Lexington Legends for the 2019 season.

He was named the bullpen coach for the Kansas City Royals for the 2023 season.

References

External links

1981 births
Living people
People from Huntingburg, Indiana
People from Dubois County, Indiana
Baseball coaches from Indiana
Baseball players from Indiana
Major League Baseball pitchers
Milwaukee Brewers players
Indiana State Sycamores baseball players
Cotuit Kettleers players
Helena Brewers players
Beloit Snappers players
High Desert Mavericks players
Huntsville Stars players
Arizona League Brewers players
Nashville Sounds players
Salt Lake Bees players
Arizona League Angels players
Scottsdale Scorpions players
Peoria Javelinas players
Minor league baseball coaches